is a former Japanese football player.

Playing career
Kawakita was born in Osaka Prefecture on May 13, 1978. After graduating from Kansai University, he joined J2 League club Ventforet Kofu in 2001. Although he played many matches from first season, he could not become a regular goalkeeper behind Hiromasa Azuma (2001) and Tatsuya Tsuruta (2002). In 2003, he moved to Japan Football League club Otsuka Pharmaceutical (later Tokushima Vortis). He became a regular goalkeeper in 2003. However his opportunity to play decreased from 2004. Although the club won the champions in 2004 season and was promoted to J2, he could not play at all in the match in 2005. In 2006, Kawakita moved to newly was promoted to J2 League club, Ehime FC. He battles with many goalkeeper for the position and played many matches every season and became a regular goalkeeper in 2011. However he could not play at all in the match behind new goalkeeper Yota Akimoto in 2012 and retired end of 2012 season.

Club statistics

References

External links

1978 births
Living people
Kansai University alumni
Association football people from Osaka Prefecture
Japanese footballers
J2 League players
Japan Football League players
Ventforet Kofu players
Tokushima Vortis players
Ehime FC players
Association football goalkeepers